Metamono is a musical trio formed in 2010 by Jono Podmore, Mark Hill and Paul Conboy to create analogue electronic music without using digital sound generation and processing, overdubs or microphones.

Their improvised compositions are created using pre-used, borrowed and handbuilt vintage analogue synths and ring modulators, enhanced by the sounds of a theremin, a siren and a valve radio.

Much of Metamono's equipment has been built or adapted by Paul Conboy (Bomb the Bass).

In 2013 Metamono released the album With the Compliments of Nuclear Physics on vinyl.

Metamono also release a six-song cassette-only EP entitled Band Theory

References 

Tape EP Review Paris Transatlantic
Decoder Article
New band of the day: Metamono (1,591)
The Quietus | Features | In Extremis | Creating A Richer Present: An Interview With Metamono
The Quietus | News | LIVE REPORT: Metamono
Metamono
SUMMER 2012

External links 

 
 Metamono Facebook page
 Metamono YouTube Channel
 BBC Artist Page
 Press release Tape EP
 www.conboymusic.com
 www.psychomat.com
 The Recycled House

See also
 Kumo (musician) Kumo/Jono Podmore

British experimental musical groups